Andy Haines (born April 2, 1977) is an American professional baseball coach and manager. He has served on the coaching staffs of the Chicago Cubs and the Milwaukee Brewers of Major League Baseball.

Career
Haines attended Eastern Illinois University, and played college baseball for the Eastern Illinois Panthers as a catcher. After graduating from Eastern Illinois, he served as an assistant for the baseball team at Olney Central College. He joined the Middle Tennessee State University (MTSU) baseball team as a graduate assistant in 2002. He spent three years at Middle Tennessee, earning a master's degree.

Haines spent two years as the manager of the summer-collegiate Waterloo Bucks in 2003 and 2004, and served as a hitting coach with the independent-league Gary SouthShore RailCats of the Northern League in 2005 and 2006. He debuted as a manager for the Windy City ThunderBolts of the independent Frontier League in 2007. He became a hitting coach in the Miami Marlins' organization in 2008, working for the Gulf Coast Marlins of the Rookie-level Gulf Coast League. The next year, he managed the Jamestown Jammers of the Class A-Short Season New York-Penn League. Haines managed the Greensboro Grasshoppers of the Class A South Atlantic League in 2010 and 2011, leading the team to the league's championship in 2011. The next two seasons, he managed the Jupiter Hammerheads of the Class A-Advanced Florida State League. He managed the New Orleans Zephyrs of the Class AAA Pacific Coast League in 2014 and 2015. In 2016, the Cubs hired Haines as their minor league hitting instructor. After the 2017 season, the Cubs promoted him to their major league staff as their assistant hitting coach.

Haines left the Cubs to become hitting coach for the Milwaukee Brewers in November 2018. The Brewers fired Haines after the 2021 season, and he was hired as the hitting coach for the Pittsburgh Pirates.

Personal life
Haines is from Louisville, Illinois. He met his wife, Erin, while at MTSU. They have three children. His younger brother, Kyle, is the director of player development for the San Francisco Giants.

References

External links

1977 births
Living people
Baseball catchers
Baseball coaches from Illinois
Chicago Cubs coaches
Eastern Illinois Panthers baseball players
Junior college baseball coaches in the United States
Major League Baseball hitting coaches
Minor league baseball coaches
Minor league baseball managers
Middle Tennessee Blue Raiders baseball coaches
Middle Tennessee State University alumni
Milwaukee Brewers coaches
People from Olney, Illinois